The 2018 Capcom Pro Tour is the fifth edition of the Capcom Pro Tour, an annual season of Street Fighter V tournaments that are officially sponsored by Capcom. The 2018 Capcom Pro Tour followed several months after the release of Street Fighter V: Arcade Edition and started off with Final Round 21 on March 16. Similarly to the 2017 season, this season featured seventeen Premier Events, a few dozen smaller tournaments, several online tournaments, and the Evolution Championship. In these tournaments, competitors gained points needed to qualify for the 2018 Capcom Cup, which was held in December.

Background
On January 16, 2018, Capcom released Street Fighter V: Arcade Edition for PC and PlayStation 5. Capcom releases only one major balance update for Street Fighter V each year, which greatly defines the experience of competitors during the Capcom Pro Tour. Several balance changes were made to address issues that arose during the 2017 Capcom Pro Tour. Twelve new player characters were added to the game in Arcade Edition, bringing the total character count up to 28. Six more DLC characters were released throughout the year, starting with Sakura in January. Street Fighter V was also given a major mid-season balance update in April.

Capcom announced in February 2018 that this year would be "Esports Year One" for the company. Besides supporting the Capcom Pro Tour as it has since 2014, the company unveiled the Capcom Esports Club and awarded $90,000 USD in prize money for the Tokyo Game Show Street Fighter V Premier Event.

It was considered for a series of Marvel vs. Capcom: Infinite tournaments to be held alongside Street Fighter V during the 2018 Capcom Pro Tour, but Capcom announced in February 2018 that the game would not be included.

Point accumulation and Cup qualification
Like in the previous year, competitors could accumulate points and climb the Pro Tour leaderboards by placing highly in Pro Tour-sponsored tournaments. Of the 32 players who qualified for the 2018 Capcom Cup, most did so by garnering points. The Capcom Pro Tour featured several types of tournaments. Placing first at a Premier Event awarded a competitor with 700 points on the leaderboard. A victory at Evo 2018 awarded a player 1,750 points, second place picking up 850 points.

The smaller Ranking Events were made less important in the 2018 Pro Tour, as the Premier Events and Evolution increased in relevance. This made it more difficult for players in regions with fewer Premier Events, such as South America, to qualify for the Cup.<ref>{{cite web|url=https://compete.kotaku.com/street-fighters-pro-tour-keeps-squeezing-out-its-middle-1823193151|work=Compete|title=Street Fighter'''s Pro Tour Keeps Squeezing Out Its Middle Class|last=Walker|first=Ian|date=2018-02-21}}</ref>

The Capcom Pro Tour includes "Regional Finals" in Europe, Asia, North America, and South America. These events feature a regular open Premier Event, as well as an invitational last-chance qualifier tournament. In this closed qualifier, the top 8 players of the local Pro Tour leaderboard competed for a guaranteed position in the Capcom Cup.

Major tournaments
The 2018 Capcom Pro Tour featured seventeen Premier Events across nine countries. These were:

Capcom Cup

The Capcom Cup concluding the 2018 Pro Tour was held in the Esports Arena in Las Vegas on December 14–16. The tournament began with a "Last Chance Qualifier" event, which filled the final spot of the 32-person Capcom Cup bracket. The tournament's first prize was set to $250,000 USD. Capcom Cup 2018 was won by Kanamori "Gachikun" Tsunehori, defeating Hiromiki "Itabashi Zangief" Kumada in the grand finals. No. 1 seed and Evo 2017 champion Taniguchi "Tokido" Hajime dropped out early during the tournament, alongside various other high-seeded players.

Downloadable content
At the end of Combo Breaker 2018, the character Cody was announced to be added to Street Fighter V''. Cody became available for download on June 26.

References

External links
 

Capcom Cup